The 1991 UCI Road World Championships took place in Stuttgart, Germany.

Events summary

References

 
UCI Road World Championships by year
UCI Road World Championships
UCI Road World Championships
UCI Road World Championships
R
UCI Road World Championships, 1991
UCI Road World Championships